Grant Comes East: A Novel of the Civil War (2004) is an alternate history novel written by Newt Gingrich, former Speaker of the United States House of Representatives; William R. Forstchen, and Albert S. Hanser, and the second of a trilogy. It is the sequel to Gettysburg: A Novel of the Civil War. The third book of the historical trilogy is called Never Call Retreat: Lee and Grant: The Final Victory and was published in 2005. The novel is illustrated with historic photographs of the Civil War. It was featured on the New York Times bestseller list.

Plot summary
The novel begins at Union Mills, Maryland. The battle that began at Gettysburg ended on July 4, 1863 (at the same time as the fall of Vicksburg) with a decisive but costly Confederate victory. General Robert E. Lee and his troops march on Washington, D.C., and launch an assault, hoping that if they can take the capital they can win the war.

Meanwhile, President Abraham Lincoln has appointed Major General Ulysses S. Grant, the victor of Vicksburg, as commander of all Union forces and ordered him to attack Lee. Grant masses his forces (the newly minted Army of the Susquehanna) at Harrisburg, while Maj. Gen. Daniel E. Sickles gains control (through his violent pacification of the New York Draft Riots) of the Army of the Potomac.

Sickles has his eye on the White House, but he needs to defeat Lee in order to win the Civil War for the War Democrats. Violating orders from Grant, he rolls his troops out to meet Lee's army alone. A sidebar shows Napoleon III planning to have France invade the United States through its client state, the Second Mexican Empire.

Bloodily repulsed at Fort Stevens outside Washington (where the black troops of the 54th Massachusetts Infantry regiment played a decisive role), Lee turns on Baltimore. Abandoned by the Union, Baltimore descends into chaos; Lee, sickened by the violence, orders the provost guard in force to end it. Using Baltimore to threaten Washington, D.C., Lee turns his entire army upon the advancing Sickles, facing off at the former site of Joppa along the Gunpowder River northeast of Baltimore.

Lee destroys the Army of the Potomac in a rout, with Sickles losing a leg in the process (as he did historically in the Battle of Gettysburg). The battle pens Lee up in Maryland, however. Grant and William T. Sherman converge on Virginia via Pennsylvania and Georgia. The novel ends with Lee scrambling to meet Grant's threat.

Historical figures

 Judah Benjamin, Confederate secretary of state
 Jefferson Davis, Confederate president
 Ulysses S. Grant, U.S. general
 Herman Haupt, U.S. general
 Robert E. Lee, Confederate general
 Abraham Lincoln, U.S. president
 James Longstreet, Confederate general
 Daniel Sickles, U.S. general
 Elihu B. Washburne, U.S. congressman
 Ely S. Parker, Grant's secretary
 John B. Hood, Confederate general
 Wade Hampton III, Confederate general
 David B. Birney, Union general
 Lewis Armistead, Confederate general
 P.G.T. Beauregard, Confederate general
 George Pickett, Confederate general
 Lafayette McLaws, Confederate general
 William T. Sherman, Union general
 J.E.B. Stuart, Confederate general
 Robert Gould Shaw, Union colonel
 Walt Whitman, Union nurse
 James B. McPherson, Union general
 Edward O. C. Ord, Union general
 Ambrose Burnside, Union general
 Horatio Seymour, Democratic New York governor
 William "Boss" Tweed, New York political boss
 George Sykes, Union general
 Gouverneur K. Warren, Union general
 Edwin Stanton, Union Secretary of War
 Gideon Welles, Union Secretary of the Navy

References

2004 American novels
Collaborative novels
Novels by Newt Gingrich
Novels by William R. Forstchen
Novels set during the American Civil War
American Civil War alternate histories
Thomas Dunne Books books